Laura Rodríguez Caballero (born 18 February 1978) is a Spanish TV director and screenwriter.

She is the screenwriter and executive producer of Aquí no hay quien viva and La que se avecina, alongside her brother Alberto Caballero. In 2022, she directed and co-wrote (with her brother) the comedy television series Alpha Males.

In 2013, she married Sergio Mitjans, with whom she worked on La que se avecina. The couple has since broken up.

Filmography
 Aquí no hay quien viva (writer: 2003–2005; director: 2003–2006)
 A tortas con la vida (director: 2005)
 La que se avecina (writer, director: 2007–2022
 El cadáver exquisito (assistant director: 2011)
 El pueblo (writer: 2019; director: 2019–2021)
 Alpha Males (writer, director: 2022)

References

External links
 
 

1978 births
Spanish television directors
Spanish television writers
Spanish television producers
Spanish comics writers
Living people